A list of films produced in Russia in 1995 (see 1995 in film).

1995

See also
 1995 in Russia

External links

1995
Russia
Films